Javier 'Javi' López Rodríguez (born 21 January 1986) is a Spanish professional footballer who plays as a full-back or central midfielder for Australian club Adelaide United FC.

He spent the vast majority of his professional career with Espanyol, having signed in 2007. During his spell, he appeared in 283 competitive matches.

Club career

Espanyol
Born in Osuna, Province of Seville, Andalusia, and a product of Real Betis' youth ranks, López signed with RCD Espanyol in 2007. On 4 October 2009, he made his debut for the first team of the latter club in a La Liga match against Villarreal CF, taking the pitch with less than ten minutes to go as the ten-man side eventually held off the hosts to a 0–0 draw. The vast majority of his first season was spent, however, with the reserves, which suffered relegation from the Segunda División B.

López was definitely promoted to the main squad for the 2010–11 campaign, being used by manager Mauricio Pochettino in various midfield and defender positions. He scored his first goal as a professional on 18 September 2011, but in a 2–1 away loss to Real Zaragoza where he was also sent off for two bookable offences, one of them resulting in a penalty.

On 29 March 2014, after Kiko Casilla was sent off late in the home fixture against FC Barcelona and his team had no replacements left, López played as a goalkeeper. He conceded no goals, in a 1–0 defeat. He extended his contract for two more years in March 2017, and earned an automatic extension to that deal due to playing the majority of games at the age of 33.

On 21 July 2020, López signed a new deal after Espanyol's relegation. A month later, he terminated it.

Adelaide United
López joined A-League club Adelaide United FC on 25 November 2020, on a one-year deal. He was persuaded to join the team by compatriot Isaías Sánchez.

In June 2021, López and fellow Spaniard Juande signed new deals to stay in South Australia for the following season. He scored his first goal for Adelaide on 1 January in a 4–0 win over Wellington Phoenix FC at Hindmarsh Stadium. After contributing to a fourth-place finish and post-season semi-final, he was named as a substitute in the league's team of the year at the PFA Footballer of the Year Awards, and his contract was extended for another year.

Honours
Individual
PFA A-League Men Team of the Season: 2021–22

References

External links

Espanyol official profile 

1986 births
Living people
People from Osuna
Sportspeople from the Province of Seville
Spanish footballers
Footballers from Andalusia
Association football defenders
Association football midfielders
Association football utility players
La Liga players
Segunda División B players
Tercera División players
Divisiones Regionales de Fútbol players
Betis Deportivo Balompié footballers
RCD Espanyol B footballers
RCD Espanyol footballers
A-League Men players
Adelaide United FC players
Spanish expatriate footballers
Expatriate soccer players in Australia
Spanish expatriate sportspeople in Australia